Thomas Sandgaard is a Danish entrepreneur and inventor based out of Colorado. Sandgaard is the founder and CEO of Zynex Inc.

Career
Sandgaard was born and raised in Denmark. He obtained his BSc in electrical and electronics engineering from University of Southern Denmark. He graduated from Copenhagen Business School with an MBA degree in marketing. In 1996, he moved to the United States and later in 2018, he gained US citizenship.In 1996, he founded Zynex Inc. and in August 2018, he founded The Sandgaard Foundation with a goal to end the opioid epidemic and save lives from opioid overdose.

In September 2020, Sandgaard acquired Charlton Athletic.

Patents obtained by Thomas Sandgaard
Method and apparatus for non-invasively detecting blood volume imbalances in a mammalian subject (20190150761), 2019
Methods and apparatus for estimating a blood volume of a mammalian subject (20120016246), 2012
Electromyogram-triggered neuromuscular stimulation device and method (20050113883), 2005

References 

Danish businesspeople
Living people
American businesspeople
Year of birth missing (living people)